Gentiana clausa, one of several plants with the common name "bottle gentian", is a 1'–2' tall flowering plant in the Gentianaceae family. It is native to Eastern North American moist meadows and woods at higher elevations, from Quebec in the north, through the Appalachian range to North Carolina and Tennessee in the south. It has paired, lanceolate leaves, usually on unbranched stalks, and blue blooms which remain closed or nearly so (thus the Latin specific name). It flowers from late August to October.

References

clausa
Flora of the Northeastern United States
Flora of the Southeastern United States
Flora of the Appalachian Mountains
Flora of Ohio
Taxa named by Constantine Samuel Rafinesque
Flora without expected TNC conservation status